Jean Walraven (September 26, 1926 – December 17, 2014) was an American hurdler. She competed in the women's 80 metres hurdles at the 1948 Summer Olympics.

References

External links
 

1926 births
2014 deaths
Athletes (track and field) at the 1948 Summer Olympics
American female hurdlers
American female long jumpers
Olympic track and field athletes of the United States
Place of birth missing
21st-century American women
20th-century American women